The 2nd constituency of Somme (French: Deuxième circonscription de la Somme) is one of five electoral districts in the department of the same name, each of which returns one deputy to the French National Assembly in elections using the two-round system, with a run-off if no candidate receives more than 50% of the vote in the first round.

Description
The constituency is made up of the six cantons of Amiens-I-Ouest, Amiens-III-Nord-Est, Amiens-V-Sud-Est, Amiens-VI-Sud, Amiens-VII-Sud-Ouest, and Boves.

At the time of the 1999 census (which was the basis for the most recent redrawing of constituency boundaries, carried out in 2010) the 2nd constituency had a total population of 99,427.

It contains most of the city of Amiens, plus the village of Boves to its south-east, separated from the city by the Étang Saint-Ladre nature reserve.

Politically the seat has historically favoured the right. Its only left-wing deputy before 2012 had been Jacques Fleury of the PS.

Historic representation

Election results

2022

 
 
 
|-
| colspan="8" bgcolor="#E9E9E9"|
|-

2017

 
 
 
 
 
 
 
|-
| colspan="8" bgcolor="#E9E9E9"|
|-

2012

 
 
 
 
 
 
|-
| colspan="8" bgcolor="#E9E9E9"|
|-

2007

 
 
 
 
 
 
 
|-
| colspan="8" bgcolor="#E9E9E9"|
|-

2002

 
 
 
 
 
 
|-
| colspan="8" bgcolor="#E9E9E9"|
|-

1997

 
 
 
 
 
 
 
|-
| colspan="8" bgcolor="#E9E9E9"|
|-

Sources
Official results of French elections from 2002: "Résultats électoraux officiels en France" (in French).

2